Ultimate Survivor is a 2004 compilation album by the American rock band Survivor, containing 18 songs from 1979 to 1988, plus the previously unreleased song "Rockin' into the Night" (which was also recorded by 38 Special in 1980).

Track listing

References

External links
 
 
 

Survivor (band) albums
2004 compilation albums
Volcano Entertainment compilation albums
Legacy Recordings compilation albums